Kaladhungi is a town and a nagar panchayat in Nainital district in the Indian state of Uttarakhand.
Gaziabad me bewafa rehti hai.

The place is located just on the foothill, a good climate but summers are hot, located 26 km west of Haldwani on the Haldwani-Ramanagar road.  Nainital is at distance of only 30 km to the north and Bazpur at about 19 km to south.  It has a road connecting to Delhi via Bazpur, Tanda, and Moradabad.

Overview

In this route there are beautiful forests on the north side.  Kaladungi has been a local commercial center for the surrounding villages in the plains, for over a century now.

Kaldhungi is a Tehsil headquarters, has an Intermediate Govt. School and Hospital, with normal facilities like electricity, water, telephone, banks, post office, etc.

It is a very fertile land and a variety of fruits and vegetables like mangoes, lychee, papaya, guava, bananas, (vegetables - potato, cauliflower, tomato, cabbage, peas, beans, eggplant, gourds, calabash, pumpkin, bitter gourd, coriander, turmeric, ginger, mustard, fenugreek, spinach, etc.). The main crops are wheat, rice, mustard, sugarcane, corn, soybean, gram, pigeon pea, green gram and red lentil.

Geography
It has an average elevation of 393 metres (1,289 feet).

Demographics
 India census, Kaladhungi had a population of 6,126. Males constitute 53% of the population and females 47%. Kaladhungi has an average literacy rate of 62%, higher than the national average of 59.5%: male literacy is 70%, and female literacy is 53%. In Kaladhungi, 16% of the population is under 6 years of age.

Local attractions

Jim Corbett, the famous man-eater hunter and a great environmentalist lived at Choti Haldwani, 2 km west of Kaladhungi on Ramnagar road for most years of his life.  His house has now been converted into a museum in his memory by the government, known as 'Jim Corbett Museum', a must-see for the tourist going to Nainital taking Kaladhunigi-Nainital road.  There are also the graves of his two dogs in the compound of the museum.
Another attraction is the Bajauniyahaldu village.

References

Cities and towns in Nainital district